Apiacás is the northernmost municipality in the Brazilian state of Mato Grosso. It is the only city in a territorial "edge" of Mato Grosso that "pierce" the boundary between Amazonas and Pará.

The municipality contains part of the  Juruena National Park, one of the largest conservation units in Brazil.

References

Municipalities in Mato Grosso
Populated places established in 2001